Kathleen Brooks is an American author of over thirty titles. She is a multiple New York Times, Wall Street Journal, and USA Today bestselling author of romantic suspense and mystery books.

Biography 
Brooks was raised in Nicholasville, Kentucky. She received her B.A. from Centre College and then her J.D. from the University of Kentucky College of Law. She was in private practice before becoming a full-time writer.

Brooks lives in Kentucky with her husband, daughter, and two dogs. She’s active in raising money for non-profits that support animals

Bibliography

Bluegrass series 
Bluegrass State of Mind  (June, 2011)
Risky Shot  (September, 2011)
Dead Heat  (December, 2011)

Bluegrass Brothers series 
Bluegrass Undercover  (March, 2012)
Rising Storm  (August, 2012)
Secret Santa  (November, 2012)
Acquiring Trouble  (January, 2013)
Relentless Pursuit  (May, 2013)
Secrets Collide  (October, 2013)
Final Vow  (January, 2014)
All Hung Up  (October, 2014)
Bluegrass Dawn  (November, 2014)
The Perfect Gift  (June, 2015)
The Keeneston Roses  (August, 2015)

Forever Bluegrass series 
Forever Entangled  (October, 2015)
Forever Hidden  (January, 2016)
Forever Betrayed  (May, 2016)
Forever Driven  (July, 2016)
Forever Secret  (January, 2017)
Forever Surprised  (July, 2017)
Forever Concealed  (September, 2017)
Forever Devoted  (January, 2018)
Forever Hunted  (May, 2018)
Forever Guarded  (July, 2018)

Shadows Landing series 
Saving Shadows  (October, 2018)

Web of Lies series 
Whispered Lies  (October, 2016)
Rogue Lies  (May, 2017)
Shattered Lies  (October, 2017)

Women of Power series 
Chosen for Power  (April, 2014)
Built for Power  (September, 2014)
Fashioned for Power  (January, 2015)
Destined for Power  (March, 2015)

References

External links 
Official Website
Book List

Living people
American women novelists
American romantic fiction novelists
Women romantic fiction writers
21st-century American novelists
21st-century American women writers
People from Nicholasville, Kentucky
Novelists from Kentucky
Centre College alumni
University of Kentucky College of Law alumni
Year of birth missing (living people)